The Kerdau state by-election is a state by-election that was scheduled held on 6 March 2011 in the state of Pahang, Malaysia. The nomination of candidates was done on 26 February 2011. The Kerdau seat fell vacant following the death of its state assemblyman Datuk Zaharuddin Abu Kassim of United Malays National Organisation, part of the Barisan Nasional coalition from a heart attack at his home. Previously Zaharuddin Abu Kassim won the Kerdau seat with a 1,615 vote majority, beating PAS' Hassanuddin Salim at the 2008 Malaysian general elections. The state assembly seat has 8,721 voters registered compromising of 88.36% Malays, 3.6% Chinese, 3.4% Indians and 2.98% other races. For the by-election PAS picked as its candidate, Hassanuddin Salim while Barisan Nasional picked Syed Ibrahim Syed Ahmad.

Results 
Syed Ibrahim Syed Ahmad, the Barisan candidate won by polling 5,060 votes against the 2,336 garnered by Hassanuddin Salim of PAS.

References

2011
2011 elections in Malaysia
Elections in Pahang